Current Affairs is an American progressive bimonthly magazine that discusses political and cultural topics. The magazine is published in print and online, and also has a podcast. It was founded by Nathan J. Robinson in 2015.

The magazine's stated missions are "to produce the world's first readable political publication and to make life joyful again". Its format is influenced by magazines such as Jacobin and Spy.

History 
Current Affairs started after a successful Kickstarter campaign in 2015.

On September 29, 2018, Current Affairs published an "exhaustive 10,000-word refutation" by Robinson of Brett Kavanaugh's testimony before the United States Senate. Robinson was invited to discuss the article on the daily WBUR-FM show On Point. He later released a video summarizing the article.

On March 29, 2019, Current Affairs published an article by Robinson criticizing 2020 Democratic presidential candidate Pete Buttigieg that The New York Times later quoted.

In August 2021, Current Affairs staffers accused Robinson of trying to fire staffers for attempting to organize the magazine as a worker-owned co-op.

Finances and staffing 
, Current Affairs used a subscription model for funding. It had two full-time staff members, a part-time administrative assistant, a full-time podcaster, and an incoming business manager. Lyta Gold (a pseudonym) was the managing editor.

Content  
, many of Current Affairs's most popular articles were by Robinson. These included the article on Kavanaugh; the article "Just Stop Worrying And Embrace The Left", in which Robinson requested that Meghan McCain follow through on the article title; and a 2016 essay critiquing Hillary Clinton as a weak candidate, which helped launch the magazine to prominence.

References

External links 
 
 YouTube channel

Advertising-free magazines
Bimonthly magazines published in the United States
Socialism in the United States
Magazines established in 2015
Magazines published in Washington, D.C.
Political magazines published in the United States
Progressivism in the United States